Deoli is a city and a municipality in Tonk district, 53 km from Tonk City in the state of Rajasthan, India.  It is the tehsil headquarters of the Deoli tehsil.

It is located 85 km from Kota.  Deoli is surrounded by Todaraisingh Tehsil towards North, Kekri Tehsil towards West, Hindoli Tehsil towards South, Jahazpur Tehsil towards South.

Todaraisingh, Tonk, Malpura, Shahpura are the nearby Cities to Deoli.

This Place is in the border of the Tonk District and Ajmer District.  Ajmer District Kekri is west towards this place.

Deoli 2011 Census Details 
Deoli Tehsil of Tonk district has total population of 214,408 as per the Census 2011. Out of which 110,648 are males while 103,760 are females. In 2011 there were total 43,632 families residing in Deoli Tehsil. The Average Sex Ratio of Deoli Tehsil is 938.

As per Census 2011 out of total population, 10.3% people lives in Urban areas while 89.7% lives in the Rural areas. The average literacy rate in urban areas is 86.7% while that in the rural areas is 58%. Also the Sex Ratio of Urban areas in Deoli Tehsil is 837 while that of Rural areas is 950.

The population of Children of age 0–6 years in Deoli Tehsil is 30123 which is 14% of the total population. There are 15928 male children and 14195 female children between the age 0–6 years. Thus as per the Census 2011 the Child Sex Ratio of Deoli Tehsil is 891 which is less than Average Sex Ratio ( 938 ) of Deoli Tehsil.

The total literacy rate of Deoli Tehsil is 61.07%. The male literacy rate is 66.52% and the female literacy rate is 37.54% in Deoli Tehsil.

Population

214,408

Literacy Rate

61.07%

Sex Ratio

938

Administrative Bifurcation

To facilitate the administration, Deoli Tehsil is further divided into 1 town and 186 villages.

Deoli Tehsil Data 
As per the Population Census 2011 data, following are some quick facts about Deoli Tehsil.

Caste-wise Population - Deoli Tehsil 

Religion-wise Population - Deoli Tehsil

Literacy Rate - Deoli Tehsil 
Average literacy rate of Deoli Tehsil in 2011 were 61.07% in which, male and female literacy were 77.7% and 43.49% respectively. Total literate in Deoli Tehsil were 112,551 of which male and female were 73,602 and 38,949 respectively.

Sex Ratio - Deoli Tehsil 
The Sex Ratio of Deoli Tehsil is 938 . Thus for every 1000 men there were 938 females in Deoli Tehsil. Also as per Census 2011, the Child Sex Ration was 891 which is less than Average Sex Ratio ( 938 ) of Deoli Tehsil.

Child Population - Deoli Tehsil 
According to Census 2011, there were 30,123 children between age 0 to 6 years in Deoli Tehsil. Out of which 30,123 were male while 30,123 were female.

Urban/Rural Population - Deoli Tehsil 
As per Census 2011, there are total 3,773 families under Deoli Tehsil living in urban areas while 3,773 families are living within Rural areas. Thus around 10.3% of total population of Deoli Tehsil lives in Urban areas while 89.7% lives under Rural areas. Population of children (0 – 6 years) in urban region is 2,537 while that in rural region is 27,586.

Working Population - Deoli Tehsil 
In Deoli Tehsil out of a total population, 105,918 were engaged in work activities. 72.3% of workers describe their work as 'main work' (employment or earning for more than six months) while 27.7% were involved in marginal activity providing a livelihood for less than six months. Of 105,918 workers engaged in main work, 43,529 were cultivators (owner or co-owner) while 9,757 were agricultural workers or labourers.

History
Deoli was established by the British in the year 1854; earlier it was a small village. It is believed that the name Deoli came from the Hindi word Devro (देवरों), meaning "Place of Gods", due to the existence of many temples to Hindu deities. It has a reservoir, "Nayanabhiram" or "Nekchal" Lake, literally meaning "good motive lake". This British-made lake was constructed to fight drought and scarcity of water. The cost of acquiring land, incurred for construction of Camp Deoli, by the British, was Rs. 368 at the time. Although most of the Princely units had accepted the sovereignty of the British, they always remained skeptical about the intentions of the annexed states. In order to overcome this, a regulation was passed, making it mandatory to keep a conservator from the annexed princely under the control of a British agent. This agent was referred to as Rokadia; although they had all the facilities they were, in a way, under the detention of the British Government. The present Senior Secondary School building was the bungalow of the then political agent, which had a swimming pool. Similarly, the famous Nevar Bagh (नेवर बाग) was also developed by the English agent. A swimming pool was also built here which has now been dumped. Today's CISF set-up was originally a prison. German and Italian civilians were interned here after the British declaration of war in 1939. Later prisoners of the Indian freedom struggle were kept here. 

After the 1962 Sino-Indian War, approximately 3000 Indian citizens of Chinese origin along with Tibetans suspected of being Chinese agents were interned here, some till 1967.

The church was established here during the British period. It is said to be about a hundred years old. There is a medieval pilgrimage center around the Deoli, which includes Borda Ganesh, Kunchalvada-Mata, Chandali Mata, Gokarneshwar Mahadev, Ravata Hanuman ji, Gadoli Mahadev, Lakdeshwar Mahadev, Hindeshwar Mahadev etc. Amongst these, there is a story associated with Hindeshwar Mahadev of Hindoli that, during exile, the Pandavas built this Shiva Lingam with only five fistfuls of clay (पाँच मुटृठी (धोबे)). There is also a folklore that ten-headed Ravana performed Shiva Worshipping in nearby Bisalpur at Gokarneshwar Mahadev Temple.

Places
It has a CISF training center. RTC Deoli was established on 1 August 1984.

RTC Deoli conducts the basic induction training of directly recruited Constables. It has been imparting professional and specialized training to officers and men of CISF and other private Security Organizations in addition to its primary task of grooming the Constables. This was one of the epicenters of the freedom struggle. It is believed that Birsa Munda was detained here.

Bisalpur Dam
The Bisalpur Project of the state is a multipurpose scheme, which supplies drinking water to Jaipur district and Ajmer, Beawar, Nasirabad and Kishangarh towns of Ajmer district besides provisions for irrigating hectares of land. The dam is constructed on the River Banas in Tonk district. Work on the Bisalpur dam was started in 1993–94.

Polling Stations/Booths near Deoli
Govt Prim School Balapura
Govt Sec School Right Part Banthali
Govt Sen Sec School Nivariya Left Part
Govt Sen Sec School Mohammadgarh
Govt Prim Sch Thikriya

How to reach Deoli

By Rail
Nearest Railway Station is Bundi (45 km). Other major stations include Kota (90km), Bhilwara (130km), Ajmer (130km), Nasirabad (100km), Niwai (100km).

Pincodes near Deoli
304803 (Chandli), 304804 (Deoli (Tonk)), 304802 (Dooni (Tonk)).

Colleges near Deoli
Govt. College, Deoli, Tonk (Deoli, Tonk)
Maharshi Kashyap College (Mehra Krishi Farm, Saroli Road, Dooni)
Krishna Mahila Mahavidyalaya (Nearby Rupesh Field In Plate Of Mahavir Gokru)
Govt. Collage Deoli (Deoli)
Mahatma Gandhi College Of Pharmaceutical Sciences (Riico, Institutional Area, Sitapura, Tonk Road, Jaipur 302022)

Schools near Deoli
Bharitiya Pub. Sec. Sch. Nagarfort (Nagarfort, Deoli, Tonk, Rajasthan. PIN 304024, Post - Uniara.)
Ups Neharu Bal Ni. Juniya (Juniya, Deoli, Tonk, Rajasthan. PIN 304802, Post - Duni (Tonk).)
Maa Bharti V.m. Ambapura (Ambapura (Ganwadi), Deoli, Tonk, Rajasthan. PIN 304804, Post - Deoli (Tonk).)
Rajan Rajiv Vidhya Dhunwa Kalan (Dhuan Kalan, Deoli, Tonk, Rajasthan. PIN 304806.)
Adarsh Indian Public Secondary School (Deoli, Tonk, Rajasthan.  PIN - 304804)
Kendriya Vidyalaya (Deoli, Tonk, Rajasthan.  PIN - 304804)

Govt Health Centers near Deoli
Government Hospital Deoli (Tonk) Rajasthan 
Raghunath Pura, Village Raghunathpura 
Ambapura, Village Ambapura 
Aanwa, Village Aanwa

References

 Deoli Coordinates

Cities and towns in Tonk district